Hovea purpurea, commonly known as velvet hovea, is a flowering plant in the family Fabaceae.  It is an upright shrub with narrow leaves, purple pea flowers and stems with matted hairs. It grows in New South Wales, Victoria and South Australia.

Description
The leaf upper surface a shiny green, smooth except for hairs on midrib, under surface thickly covered with cream-brown, curly hairs, faintly veined, midrib hairs thick and brown-orange.

Taxonomy and naming
Hovea purpurea was first formally described in 1827 by Robert Sweet and the description was published in Flora Australasica. The specific epithet (purpurea) means "purple".

Distribution and habitat
Velvet hovea grows on banks near streams and rocky ledges in forests and woodland. In New South Wales in occurs from Mt Kaputar to the south-eastern corner of the state. In Victoria on the upper Genoa River in East Gippsland and in South Australia at Mount Remarkable.

References

purpurea
Fabales of Australia
Plants described in 1827